Vadim Sergeyevich Garin (born 14 December 1979) is a former Russian professional football player.

Club career
He made his debut in the Russian Premier League in 2001 for FC Sokol Saratov.

References

1979 births
Sportspeople from Saratov
Living people
Russian footballers
Association football midfielders
Association football defenders
FC Lada-Tolyatti players
FC Sokol Saratov players
Russian Premier League players
FC Chernomorets Novorossiysk players